The Nicobar gliding gecko (Gekko nicobarensis) is a species of gecko. It is endemic to the Nicobar Islands (India).

References 

Gekko
Endemic fauna of the Nicobar Islands
Reptiles of India
Reptiles described in 2009